Bernie Buescher (born July 11, 1949) is an American politician who served as secretary of state of Colorado. A Democrat, he was appointed to the office in 2009 by Governor of Colorado Bill Ritter to fill the vacancy left by the resignation of Republican Mike Coffman.

Early life
Buescher was born in Grand Junction, Colorado. He attended the University of Notre Dame, graduating with an accounting degree. He received his J.D from the University of Colorado in 1974.

Career
After law school, Buescher returned to Grand Junction and joined the law firm of Williams, Turner and Holmes, where he practiced corporate law until 1987; that year he became president and CEO of West Star Aviation.

In 1996, Governor Roy Romer asked Buescher to serve as interim manager for the Colorado State Fair. Romer then appointed Buescher as executive director of the Colorado Department of Health Care Policy and Financing in 1997. Buescher resigned in 1998 to unsuccessfully run for lieutenant governor with Gail Schoettler as governor.

Politics
In 2004 Buescher was elected to the Colorado General Assembly, where he served two terms. In the legislature, Buescher was appointed to the Joint Budget Committee by Speaker Andrew Romanoff; he served as chair of the Joint Budget Committee in 2006 and 2008, and also chaired the House Appropriations Committee in 2007 and 2008. 

In 2009, Buescher was appointed by Governor Bill Ritter to serve as Colorado Secretary of State.

Buescher was unsuccessful in his election bid in 2010, losing to Scott Gessler. Shortly after the election, Buescher was asked by John Suthers, the Republican attorney general, to serve as deputy attorney general. Buescher served in this position until September 2014.

In December 2015, Buescher joined the firm of Ireland Stapleton Pryor and Pascoe. His practice involves regulatory matters related to health care, energy and elections.

Buescher has served on non-profit boards, including the Ara Parseghian Medical Research Foundation, the Governor's Residence Preservation Fund, the Colorado Children's Campaign, Bright by Three, St. Mary's Hospital, the Colorado Health and Hospital Association and the Colorado Youth Conservation Corps.

References

Secretaries of State of Colorado
Living people
1949 births
People from Grand Junction, Colorado
Colorado Democrats